Gulab Singh Shaktawat was an Indian freedom fighter, social and political worker of Indian National Congress. A long serving MLA and a Minister in the Govt. of Rajasthan from Mewar region, Member PCC, Member AICC, remained Vice President of Rajasthan Congress.

References

Year of birth missing
2006 deaths
Indian National Congress politicians
Rajasthani politicians
Indian National Congress politicians from Rajasthan